"Buddy X" is a song by Swedish musician Neneh Cherry, released in 1993 as the third and final single from her second album, Homebrew (1992). Co-written and co-produced by Cherry, it was a top 40 hit in both the Netherlands and the United Kingdom, peaking at numbers 23 and 35, respectively. The song also charted in the United States, reaching No. 43 on the Billboard Hot 100, and in Canada, where it reached No. 28 on the RPM Top Singles chart. Additionally, it was a number two hit on the European Dance Radio Chart and a number four hit on the Billboard Hot Dance Club Play chart.

Critical reception
Larry Flick from Billboard felt the song is "way-hip", adding that on this "hip-hop-derived romp", Cherry "further proves that her double talent for singing and rhyming comes in mighty handy, as she swerves from sassy street kid-to worldly chanteuse with ease." Dave Sholin from the Gavin Report said, "She speaks for all those who've been jacked around by that special someone in their life. Her message really cuts through, thanks to a catchy hook woven into not only the chorus, but the entire track." Chris Dafoe from Globe & Mail remarked that the song finds Cherry "tipping towards soul". In his weekly UK chart commentary, James Masterton commented, "The latest is unlikely to progess much further either, a far cry from the days of "Buffalo Stance" and "Manchild"." 

A reviewer from Music & Media wrote that "intrinsically this is a slow song, but it has the drive of a real mean stomper. When Neneh sings "yeah yeah" you automatically join in and your feet start itching." Dave Piccioni from the RM Dance Update remarked that the singer "drops the home girl stuff just long enough for us to discover that there's been a good voice in there all along." Adam Higginbotham from Select viewed it as "a fine, simple song — Neneh's voice is laid over bubbling clarinet, scalding backing vocals, and simple R&B guitar lick." Sian Pattenden from Smash Hits gave "Buddy X" three out of five, adding that "this tune seems boring at first but is a "grower". It has a nice beat and some friendly backing sorts who croon "yeah yeah yeah"."

Music video
A music video was produced to promote the single. It was directed by French fashion photographer and music video director Jean-Baptiste Mondino.

1999 remix

In 1999, "Buddy X" was remixed by UK garage trio the Dreem Teem and retitled "Buddy X 99". This version was a top-twenty hit, peaking at No. 15 on the UK Singles Chart and No. 1 on the UK Dance Singles Chart. Other mixes on the single include the Original Dreem Teem Edit, the Dreem Teem Vocal Mix and the Original Dreem Teem Dub Mix.

Track listing
 CD single
 "Buddy X 99" (Dreem House Edit) - 3:21
 "Buddy X 99" (Original Dreem Teem Edit) - 3:33
 "Buddy X 99" (Dreem Teem Vocal Mix) - 5:02
 "Buddy X 99" (Original Dreem Teem Dub Mix) - 5:32

Charts

Original version

1999 remix

References

1992 songs
1993 singles
1999 singles
Neneh Cherry songs
UK garage songs
Songs written by Neneh Cherry
Songs written by Cameron McVey
Song recordings produced by Cameron McVey
Song recordings produced by Jonny Dollar
Virgin Records singles
Music videos directed by Jean-Baptiste Mondino